Order Order Out of Order is a 2019 Gujarati courtroom drama starring Jinal Belani, Raunaq Kamdar and Gaurav Paswala.  On a concept created by Shyam Khandhedia, the film was directed by Dhwani Gautam and produced by Shyam Khandhedia and Rahul Savani under banner of Spark Films & Company. The film was released in India by Pen India Limited on 1 February 2019.

Plot 
The film focuses on the story of two brothers Yash Thakkar and Raj Thakkar, who are fighting their inner demons. After training as lawyers, they decide to follow the path of truth and honesty. While doing so, they establish their own firm. One such case changes their lives and leaves them in turmoil.

Cast 

 Raunaq Kamdar
 Jinal Belani
 Gaurav Paswala
 Dharmesh Vyas
 Minal Patel
 Anang Desai
 Prem Gadhavi
 Shekhar Shukla
 Hemang Dave
 Neha Reddy 
 Nikhil Harsh
 Ojas Rawal
Manan Desai
 Prashant Barot
 Yagnesh Dave

Production
The film was produced by Shyam Khandhedia  and Rahul Savani for Spark Films and Company. The story and concept was created by Shyam Khandhedia. Rahul Munjariya is music director of the film. KK made his debut in Gujarati Film industry in the film.

Shooting started in mid-September 2018 in some parts of Ahmedabad,

The soundtrack of the album is composed by Rahul Munjaria with lyrics written by Bhargav Purohit. The soundtrack album consists of two tracks released by Zee Music Company

Release
The official trailer of the film was released by Spark Films on 28 December 2018.

References

External links
 

2019 films
Films set in Ahmedabad
Films shot in Ahmedabad
Films shot in Gujarat
Indian courtroom films
2010s Gujarati-language films